Hemings is a surname, and may refer to:

 American slavery
 Hemings family
 Elizabeth "Betty" Hemings (1735–1807), enslaved American
 Sally Hemings (1773–1835), enslaved by  US president Thomas Jefferson who allegedly bore him 6 children 
 Mary Hemings (1753-after 1834), American, ex-slave
 Martin Hemings (1755-after 1795), American, enslaved butler to Thomas Jefferson
 John Hemings (1776–1833), American, ex-slave
 Madison Hemings (1805–1877), son of ex-slave Sally Hemings
 Harriet Hemings (1801–1870), American, ex-slave
 Eston Hemings (1808–1850), American, ex-slave

See also
 Hemmings
 Heming (disambiguation)